Schlinge is a river of North Rhine-Westphalia, Germany, and Gelderland, Netherlands. Dutch names are Boven-Slinge and Bielheimerbeek. Its source is between Gescher and Stadtlohn. It flows generally west through Südlohn, Winterswijk, Bredevoort, Aalten and Varsseveld. It flows into the Oude IJssel between Gaanderen and Doetinchem.

See also
List of rivers of North Rhine-Westphalia

References

Rivers of North Rhine-Westphalia
Rivers of Germany
International rivers of Europe